Conus josephinae is a species of sea snail, a marine gastropod mollusk in the family Conidae, the cone snails and their allies.

Like all species within the genus Conus, these snails are predatory and venomous. They are capable of "stinging" humans, therefore live ones should be handled carefully or not at all.

Description
The size of the shell varies between 20 mm and 31 mm.

Distribution
This species occurs in the Eastern Atlantic Ocean off the Cape Verdes.

References

 Rolán, E., 1980. Descripcion de Tres Nuevas Especies del Genero Conus Linne, 1758 (Mollusca: Gastropoda), Procedentes del Archipielago de Cabo Verde. Bollettino Malacologico, 16 (3–4 ): 79 -94 
 Tucker J.K. (2009). Recent cone species database. September 4, 2009 Edition
 Tucker J.K. & Tenorio M.J. (2009) Systematic classification of Recent and fossil conoidean gastropods. Hackenheim: Conchbooks. 296 pp.
 Cossignani T. & Fiadeiro R. (2017). Otto nuovi coni da Capo Verde. Malacologia Mostra Mondiale. 94: 26-36.page(s): 27
  Puillandre N., Duda T.F., Meyer C., Olivera B.M. & Bouchet P. (2015). One, four or 100 genera? A new classification of the cone snails. Journal of Molluscan Studies. 81: 1–23

External links
 The Conus Biodiversity website
 Cone Shells – Knights of the Sea
 

josephinae
Gastropods of Cape Verde
Endemic fauna of Cape Verde
Gastropods described in 1980